The year 1692 in science and technology:

Events
 In the American colonies, the Salem witch trials develop, following 250 years of witch-hunts in Europe.

Mathematics
 The tractrix, sometimes called a tractory or equitangential curve, is first studied by Christiaan Huygens, who gives it its name.
 John Arbuthnot publishes Of the Laws of Chance (translated from Huygens' De ratiociniis in ludo aleae), the first work on probability theory in English.

Medicine
 Thomas Sydenham's Processus integri ("The Process of Healing") is published posthumously.

Births
 April 22 – James Stirling, Scottish mathematician (died 1770)

Deaths
 May – John Banister, English missionary and botanist, accidentally shot (born 1654)

References

 
17th century in science
1690s in science